Kravany may refer to several places in Slovakia:

Kravany, village and municipality in Poprad District
Kravany, village and municipality in Trebišov District
Kravany nad Dunajom, village and municipality in Komárno District